Riscoe is a surname. Notable people with the surname include:

 Arthur Riscoe (1895–1954), British stage and film actor
 Maureen Riscoe (1921–2003), British actress and casting director, daughter of Arthur

See also
 Briscoe (surname)
 Risco (disambiguation)
 Roscoe (name)